"Lay Your Troubles Down" was the third single for Angela Winbush's second album, The Real Thing. "Lay Your Troubles Down" features her then husband Ronald Isley. The song became her fourth top 10 solo single (eight in total) summer 1990.

Charts

References

Angela Winbush songs
1990 singles
Male–female vocal duets
Songs written by Angela Winbush
1989 songs
PolyGram singles